"Traitor in Zebra" is the eleventh episode of the second series of the 1960s cult British spy-fi television series The Avengers, starring Patrick Macnee and Honor Blackman. It was first broadcast by ABC on 8 December 1962. The episode was directed by Richmond Harding and written by John Gilbert.

Plot
In Wales, a new satellite tracking system is being jammed every time it is used. Steed and Cathy search for the traitor who is passing on information about the project.

Cast
 Patrick Macnee as John Steed
 Honor Blackman as Cathy Gale 
 John Sharp as Rankin  
 Richard Leech as Franks 
 Noel Coleman as Captain Nash  
 Jack Stewart as Thorne 
 Ian Shand as Lieutenant Mellors 
 William Gaunt as Sub-Lieutenant Graham  
 June Murphy as Maggie 
 Katy Wild as Linda   
 Michael Danvers-Walker as Crane 
 Richard Pescud as Escorting Officer 
 Michael Browning as Wardroom Steward

References

External links

Episode overview on The Avengers Forever! website

The Avengers (season 2) episodes
1962 British television episodes